The 1971–72 Yugoslav Ice Hockey League season was the 30th season of the Yugoslav Ice Hockey League, the top level of ice hockey in Yugoslavia. Six teams participated in the league, and Olimpija have won the championship.

Final ranking
Olimpija
Jesenice
Medveščak
Kranjska Gora
Slavija Vevče
Partizan

References

External links
Yugoslav Ice Hockey League seasons

Yugoslav
Yugoslav Ice Hockey League seasons
1971–72 in Yugoslav ice hockey